Raniwara is a town in Jalore District of Rajasthan state in India. Situated 35 km south of the Bhinmal on Jalore-Sanchore road, it is headquarters of the tehsil by Raniwala Kallan. Raniwara is 109 km from Mount Abu and 20 km from the town of Bhinmal.

Raniwara is connected By Samdari-Bhildi railway line. There is a big dairy plant of Rajasthan in the town run by Jalore-Sirohi Zila Dugdh Utpadak Sahakari Sangh Ltd. Malwara, Badgaon, Ajodar, Jakhri, Dhanol, Badgaon (Jalore district), Silasan, Mokhatra,Sewadiya,Meda,Varetha and Raniwara khurd are some of its nearby villages.

The Sundha Mata temple is located 20 km From Raniwara. The temple is situated on a hilltop called 'Sundha', at 72°-22' E longitude and 24°-50' N latitude. Garba Chowk Temple of Mother Goddess in Raniwara where Garba dance is performed during Navratri days.The Hinglaj temple is also in Raniwara. It is the seat of Hinglaj goddess and worshipped by Khatri community. Pipaji temple is also situated here Pipaji was a lok sant worship by Pipa Khatriya community.

References 

Cities and towns in Jalore district